Cryptosporangium eucalypti is a bacterium species from the genus of Cryptosporangium which has been isolated from the roots of the tree Eucalyptus camaldulensis from Kamphaeng Phet Province in Thailand.

References

External links
Type strain of Cryptosporangium eucalypti at BacDive -  the Bacterial Diversity Metadatabase

Actinomycetia
Bacteria described in 2017